Vrbica ( in Serbo-Croatian) may refer to:

Places

Bosnia and Herzegovina
 Vrbica (Bileća), a village near Bileća
 Vrbica (Goražde), a village near Goražde
 Vrbica (Jajce), a village near Jajce
 Vrbica (Livno), a village near Livno
 Vrbica, Žepče

Croatia
 Vrbica, Dubrovnik-Neretva County, a village near Dubrovnik
 Vrbica, Osijek-Baranja County, a village near Semeljci
 Vrbica, Bjelovar-Bilogora County, a village near Veliko Trojstvo

Montenegro
 Vrbica, Nikšić, a village near Nikšić
 Vrbica, Pljevlja, a village near Pljevlja
 Vrbica, Podgorica, a village near Podgorica

Serbia
 Vrbica (Čoka), a village near Čoka
 Vrbica (Aranđelovac), a village near Aranđelovac
 Vrbica (Zaječar), a village near Zaječar
 Mala Vrbica (Kragujevac), a village near Kragujevac
 Mala Vrbica (Mladenovac), a village near Mladenovac
 Mala Vrbica (Kladovo), a village near Kladovo
 Velika Vrbica (Kladovo), a village near Kladovo

Slovenia
 Vrbica, Slovenia, a village in the Ilirska Bistrica

Other uses
 Vrbica (Serbian),  a Serbian Orthodox holiday
 Mašo Vrbica (1833-1898), Montenegrin duke and military commander
 Vrbica Stefanov (Врбица Стефанов) (born 1973), Macedonian professional basketball player

See also 
 Varbitsa (disambiguation), for the Bulgarian spelling of the word
 Vrbnica (disambiguation)
 Vrba (disambiguation),